Coleophora calida is a moth of the family Coleophoridae.

References

calida
Moths described in 1988